A registrar is a senior administrative executive within an academic institution (consisting of a college, university, or secondary school) who oversees the management and leadership of the Registrar's Office.

General duties and function
Typically, a registrar processes registration requests, schedules classes and maintains class lists, enforces the rules for entering or leaving classes, and keeps a permanent record of grades and marks. In institutions with selective admission requirements, a student only begins to be in connection with the registrar's official actions after admission.
Various grades of professional academic-related staff perform senior administrative and managerial roles in such universities on behalf of the registrar or head of department and head subsections of the administration. Titles afforded to such staff include assistant registrar, senior assistant registrar and principal assistant registrar.

Registrars in the United Kingdom
In the United Kingdom, the term registrar is usually used for the head of the university's administration. The role is usually combined with that of secretary of the university's governing bodies and in these cases, the full title will often be "registrar and secretary" (or "secretary and registrar") to reflect these dual roles. The University of Cambridge in England uses the archaic spelling of "Registrary" for this office.

Registrars in Canada
In Canada, the registrar is an administrative position, usually responsible for admissions, records and registration, academic scheduling, front line service and support, strategic enrollment data management and analysis, academic policy, and graduation (sometimes known as convocation).

Registrars in Ireland
In Ireland, the registrar is usually the chief academic officer, and the title is often combined with such titles as "deputy president" or "vice-president for academic affairs".

Registrar's office 
A registrar's office is an essential unit within a college, university, or secondary school. The registrar's office provides a variety of services and supports for prospective students, current students, faculty, and staff related to:

 Marketing and recruitment
Admissions
 Registration
 Graduations

 Course Catalog Publishing
 Curriculum Management
 Class Scheduling
 Academic Records
 Examinations
 Data Analytics
 Student awards and financial aid
 Athletic Compliance
 Veterans’ Educational Benefits
 Mass communications

Semi-Academic Service 
Services provided by the supporting units of an educational institution or university.

See also
 Association of University Administrators

References

Academic administration
Education and training occupations